Pseudorchis is a monotypic genus of flowering plants from the orchid family, Orchidaceae. The sole species is the small white orchid (Pseudorchis albida). It is found across much of Europe and northern Asia from Spain and Iceland to Kamchatka, including France, Great Britain, Germany, Poland, Scandinavia, Ukraine and much of Russia. It also occurs in Greenland and eastern Canada (Quebec, Newfoundland & Labrador). (Codes) 

Three subspecies are recognized:
Pseudorchis albida subsp. albida - from Spain and Iceland to Kamchatka
Pseudorchis albida subsp. straminea  - Scandinavia, northern Russia, Greenland, Canada
Pseudorchis albida subsp. tricuspis  - Sweden, Switzerland, Austria, Poland, Romania, former Yugoslavia

See also 
 List of Orchidaceae genera

References 

 , J. F. (1754) Plantae Veronenses 3: 254.
  (2001). Orchidoideae (Part 1). Genera Orchidacearum 2: 357 ff. Oxford University Press.
  2005. Handbuch der Orchideen-Namen. Dictionary of Orchid Names. Dizionario dei nomi delle orchidee. Ulmer, Stuttgart

External links 

Den virtuella floran - Distribution

Monotypic Orchidoideae genera
Orchideae genera
Orchideae
Orchids of North America
Orchids of Europe
Orchids of Russia